Zirnis (feminine: Ābola) is a Latvian surname, derived from the Latvian word for "pea". Individuals with the surname include:

Dzintars Zirnis (born 1977), Latvian footballer
Kārlis Zirnis (born 1977), Latvian ice hockey player and coach

Latvian-language masculine surnames